Douglas C. Schmidt (born July 18, 1962) is a computer scientist and author in the fields of object-oriented programming, distributed computing and design patterns.

Biography 
In August 1994 he joined the faculty of Washington University in St. Louis.
From August 1999 to December 2002 he was associate professor with tenure at the University of California, Irvine.
During much of this time he worked for DARPA managing US federal funded research programs.
In 2003 he became professor of computer Science at Vanderbilt University, and associate chair of computer science and engineering in December 2004.
In August 2010 he became a deputy director, research, and chief technology officer at Software Engineering Institute. In April 2013 he became a director at Real-Time Innovations.

He led teams that developed an Adaptive Communication Environment (ACE), The ACE ORB (TAO), a component-integrated ACE ORB (CIAO), and an implementation of the Deployment and Configuration standard built on top of TAO (DAnCE).
"ORB" refers to a key piece of the Common Object Request Broker Architecture.
They were made available as open-source software.

Publications

Articles 
Douglas C. Schmidt published articles in C++ Report and C/C++ Users Journal. He edited "Object Interconnections" column in C/C++ Users Journal, and "Patterns++" column in C++ Report.

Books

References 

American computer scientists
American technology writers
Living people
1962 births
Washington University in St. Louis faculty
University of California, Irvine faculty
Vanderbilt University faculty